Søren Østergaard Tengstedt (born 30 June 2000) is a Danish professional footballer who plays for Danish Superliga club Silkeborg IF as a forward.

Club career

Early years
Tengstedt started playing football at local club Nibe Boldklub, where his father, Kim Tengstedt, was his coach for several years. At the age of 11, Tengstedt moved to Aalborg Freja before joining AaB as a U13 player. After a half year at AaB, he was named AaB U13 player of the year. On his 15th birthday, 30 June 2015, Tengstedt signed a two-year youth contract with AaB.

In the summer 2017, Tengstedt tore his cruciate ligament and was sidelined for one year. The injury ruined his first year as a U19 player and when he returned, he played with the second U19 team. He returned to the best U19 team in October 2018.

AaB
On 11 June 2019, AaB confirmed that Tengstedt was one out of five players who had been promoted permanently to the first team squad. Tengstedt had a contract until 30 June 2020.

Tengstedt made his official debut for AaB on 22 September 2019 against FC Nordsjælland in the Danish Superliga. He started on the bench but replaced Mikkel Kaufmann with 18 minutes left of the game. After four Danish Superliga games for AaB, Tengstedt was surprisingly selected for the Danish national under-21 team.

AGF
On 16 July 2020, Tengstedt signed a four-year contract with AGF. He made his debut on 27 August in a UEFA Europa League match against Finnish club FC Honka, coming on as a 70th-minute substitute for Jón Dagur Þorsteinsson. In injury time, he also scored his first goal for the club to secure a 5–2 win.

Silkeborg
In order for him to play more, Tengstedt left AGF and joined Silkeborg IF on 1 September 2021. He made his debut for the club the following day in a 3–1 win over Skive IK in the Danish Cup, coming on as a substitute in the 64th minute for Anders Klynge. His domestic league debut for Silkeborg followed on 10 September in a 1–1 draw against Brøndby, where he came on in the 65th minute for Nicklas Helenius. Tengstedt scored his first goal on 23 September in a 3–2 cup loss to AC Horsens.

Personal life
Søren comes from a football family. Søren's father, Kim Tengstedt, was a former professional who played for AaB. His uncle, René Tengstedt, was also a former professional footballer. Casper Tengstedt, who is the son of Thomas Tengstedt, is his cousin who also is a footballer.

Honours
AaB
Danish Cup runner-up: 2019–20

References

Living people
2000 births
People from Nibe
Association football forwards
Danish men's footballers
Denmark youth international footballers
Denmark under-21 international footballers
AaB Fodbold players
Aarhus Gymnastikforening players
Silkeborg IF players
Danish Superliga players
Sportspeople from the North Jutland Region